"Golden Blunders" is a song by the American alternative rock band the Posies, released as the first single released from its major label debut album Dear 23 in 1990.

History
A Japanese single of this is known to exist and features three versions of 'Golden Blunders': lp version, radio edit and an acoustic version. The cover has the distorted pictures of the band from inside the Dear 23 album.

Covers
Ringo Starr covered the song for his 1992 album, Time Takes Time.

Track listing

"Golden Blunders"

Chart positions

References 

1990 debut singles
The Posies songs
Song recordings produced by John Leckie
Songs written by Ken Stringfellow
Songs written by Jon Auer
1990 songs